Thomas Willement (18 July 1786 – 10 March 1871) was an English stained glass artist, called "the father of Victorian stained glass", active from 1811 to 1865.

Biography
Willement was born at St Marylebone, London. Like many early 19th century  provincial stained glass artists, he began as a plumber and glazier, the two jobs, now separate trades, being at that time linked because both required the skills of working with lead. In 1811, Willement produced a window with a heraldic shield. It was from this beginning that he went on to become one of the most successful of England’s early 19th century stained glass artists.

Influences

The great period of stained glass manufacturing had been the period from about 1100 until about 1500. After that time, with the Dissolution of the Monasteries under Henry VIII and the destruction of the Church’s artworks by Puritans in the Parliamentary period, there was little stained glass manufacture. Those few windows which were produced between 1500 and 1800 were generally of painted glass, in which process the colours were applied by brush to the surface of the glass and fired to anneal them, rather than the artist working with numerous sections of coloured glass and piecing them together.

It has been claimed of Willement that through his observations of old windows, he reinvented the ancient method of leading coloured pieces and integrating the visually black lines created between the colours by the lead cames into the design of the window.  From observing 14th-century windows such as the west window of York Minster, Willement developed the artistic method of arranging figures one to each single light, surmounted by a decorative canopy.

He was further encouraged after 1839 in the archaeological direction that his work took by the Cambridge Camden Society, who promoted all things Medievalising in the structure of new churches and the restoration of old ones. Willement was encouraged by the society and also received the patronage of Augustus Pugin, the most famous ecclesiastical architect and designer of churches. However, Willement suffered a falling-out with Pugin who accused him of being mercenary. (Pugin also had previously fallen out with his first stained glass artist, Willement's pupil, William Warrington.) It is also possible that the style of Willement's figures was not sufficiently archaeologically correct to satisfy Pugin, who was himself a meticulous and elegant draftsman.

Success
The break with Pugin did not set back Willement's success. He had been the armorial painter to George IV (reigned 1820–1830) and became, by Royal Patent, "Artist in Stained Glass" to Queen Victoria, making much armorial glass for St George's Chapel, Windsor, and restoring the ancient windows there. In 1851 he was one of the 25 stained glass artists who exhibited at the Crystal Palace Exhibition.

In 1846–47, Willement made eight stained-glass windows with heraldic designs for St Michael and All Angels Church, Badminton, Gloucestershire. They all feature blue borders and badges in the yellow of the Duke of Beaufort's livery.

Davington Priory
By 1845 Willement, aged 59, had become wealthy and looked around for a home with a suitable resonance in which to spend his later years. He purchased Davington Priory near Faversham in Kent, a nunnery established in the 12th century and complete with its own church (the buildings had been spared in the Dissolution because by 1527 there were only three elderly nuns remaining). Willement restored and extended the buildings to make a comfortable home, and installed his own heraldic glass with the motto "Thynke and Thanke". Since he owned the church as well, he refurbished it with stained glass and had Taylors of Loughborough install five bells, each cast with the same motto, in the bell tower.

Thomas Willement married Katharine Griffith, who died in 1856. He died in 1871, aged 85, and was buried alongside his wife in a vault in the church he had restored.

Davington Priory has since 1983 been the home of the musician Bob Geldof.

List of works

 All Saints' Church, Freethorpe, Norfolk

Published works
 Regal Heraldry: the Armorial Insignia of the Kings and Queens of England, from Coeval Authorities. London, 1821.
 Heraldic Notices of Canterbury Cathedral; with Genealogical and Topographical Notes. To Which is Added a Chronological List of the Archbishops of Canterbury, with the Blazon of their Respective Arms. London, 1827.
 Fac Simile of a Contemporary Roll, with the Names and the Arms of the Sovereign, and of the Spiritual and Temporal Peers who sat in the Parliament held at Westminster AD 1515. London, 1829.
 Banners Standards and Badges, From a Tudor Manuscript in the College of Arms With an Introduction by Howard De Walden. The De Walden Library, 1904 – contains Willement's tracings from 1831.
 A Roll of Arms of the Reign of Richard the Second. London, 1834.
 A Concise Account of the Principal Works in Stained Glass that have been Executed by Thomas Willement. London, 1840.
 An Account of the Restorations of the Collegiate Chapel of St George, Windsor. With some Particulars of the Heraldic Ornaments of that Edifice. London, 1844.
 Historical Sketch of the Parish of Davington, in the County of Kent, and of the Priory there. London, 1862.
 Heraldic Antiquities: a Collection of Original Drawings of Charges, Arrangements of Early Examples, &c., with Numerous Engravings of Coats of Arms, Fac Similes of Stained Glass, and Tracings of Early Brasses. London, 1865.

See also

Other early 19th century firms 
 William Wailes
 William Warrington
 Charles Edmund Clutterbuck
 Hardman & Co.
 Augustus Welby Pugin
 William Holland

Context 
 British and Irish stained glass (1811–1918)
 Gothic Revival architecture
 Poor Man's Bible

References

Sources
 Painton Cowen, A Guide to Stained Glass in Britain, 1985, Michael Joseph, 
 Elizabeth Morris, Stained and Decorative Glass, Doubleday, 
 Sarah Brown,  Stained Glass – an Illustrated History, Bracken Books, 
 Simon Jenkins, England's Thousand Best Churches, Allen Lane, the Penguin Press, 
 John Harvey, English Cathedrals, Batsford, 1961
 Cliff and Monica Robinson, Stained Glass of Buckinghamshire Churches

British stained glass artists and manufacturers
1786 births
1871 deaths